Al Hajar (مركز الحجر) is a municipality and village in Al-'Ula, Medina Region, Saudi Arabia. It lies in the northeastern part of the governorate, 55 km from Al-'Ula on the road to Asfelti.

The UNESCO site of the ruins of Mada'in Saleh is located within the Al Hajar municipality.

Notes and references

Populated places in Medina Province (Saudi Arabia)